Feudalism as practiced in the Kingdoms of England during the medieval period was a state of human society that organized political and military leadership and force around a stratified formal structure based on land tenure. As a military defense and socio-economic paradigm designed to direct the wealth of the land to the king while it levied military troops to his causes, feudal society was ordered around relationships derived from the holding of land. Such landholdings are termed fiefdoms, traders, fiefs, or fees.

Origins of feudalism

The word, "feudalism", was not a medieval term, but an invention of sixteenth century French and English lawyers to describe certain traditional obligations between members of the warrior aristocracy. Not until 1748 did it become a popular and widely used word, thanks to Montesquieu's De L'Esprit des Lois (The Spirit of the Laws). The coined word feudal derives from an ancient Gothic source faihu signifying simply "property" which in its most basic sense was "cattle" and is a cognate of the classical Latin word pecus, which means both "cattle", "money" and "power". European feudalism had its roots in the Roman manorial system (in which workers were compensated with protection while living on large estates) and in the 8th century CE Kingdom of the Franks where a king gave out land for life (benefice) to reward loyal nobles and receive service in return.

Between the withdrawal of the Roman Empire from Britain in the fourth century and the onset of the Viking raids in the eighth century, individual land ownership vanished from England. Instead, small tribal bands were bonded by kinship, geographical identification, or religion rather than land ownership. Eventually, forces like the (Norman) Franks grew in power and influence across parts of Europe, and the centralization of governance under a conquering over-ruler spread with regions paying allegiance to a king by providing fighters and funds.

The obligation to raise revenue and fighters from the land and the corresponding rights between lord and vassal concerning the fief formed the basis of the feudal relationship.

Classic English feudalism
Feudalism took root in England with William of Normandy's conquest in 1066. Before that, the seven relatively small individual English kingdoms, known collectively as the Heptarchy, maintained an unsteady relationship of raids, ransoms, and truces with Vikings from Denmark and Normandy from around the seventh-to-tenth centuries. Viking dominance led to separation of an eastern segment of the land into a region known as the Danelaw that generated income for the Danes rather than for any of the English kingdoms. This fracture in the stability of the Heptarchy paved the way for the successful Norman Conquest, and England's new king, William I, initiated a system of land grants to his vassals, the powerful knights who fought alongside him, in order to have them maintain his new order throughout the kingdom.

The feudal system of governance and economics thrived in England throughout the high medieval period, a time in which the wealthy prospered while the poor labored on the land with relatively little hope of economic autonomy or representative government. In the later medieval period, feudalism began to diminish in England with the eventual centralization of government that began around the first quarter of the fourteenth century, and it remained in decline until its eventual abolition in England with the Tenures Abolition Act 1660. By then, a deeply embedded socio-economic class disparity had laid the foundation for the rise of capitalism to take the place of feudalism as the British Empire grew.

Under the English feudal system, the person of the king (asserting his allodial right) was the only absolute "owner" of land. All nobles, knights and other tenants, termed vassals, merely "held" land from the king, who was thus at the top of the "feudal pyramid". When feudal land grants were of indefinite or indeterminate duration, such grants were deemed freehold, while fixed term and non-hereditable grants were deemed non-freehold. However, even freehold fiefs were not unconditionally heritable—before inheriting, the heir had to pay a suitable feudal relief.

Beneath the king in the feudal pyramid was a tenant-in-chief (generally a baron or knight) who, as the king's vassal, held and drew profit from a piece of the king's land. At the next tier of feudalism, holding land from the vassal was a mesne tenant (generally a knight, sometimes a baron, including tenants-in-chief in their capacity as holders of other fiefs) who in turn held parcels of land when sub-enfeoffed by the tenant-in-chief. Below the mesne tenant, further mesne tenants could hold from each other in series, creating a thriving, if complicated, feudal pyramid.

Vassalage
Before a lord (or king) could grant land (a fief) to a tenant, he had to make that person a vassal. This was done at a formal and symbolic ceremony called a commendation ceremony, composed of the two-part act of homage and oath of fealty. During homage, the lord and vassal entered a contract in which the vassal promised to fight for the lord at his command, whilst the lord agreed to protect the vassal from external forces, a valuable right in a society without police and with only a rudimentary justice system.

The contract, once entered, could not be broken lightly. It was often sworn on a relic like a saint's bone or on a copy of the Gospel, and the gravitas of the commendation was accentuated by the clasping of the vassal’s hands between the lord’s as the oath was spoke. A ceremonial kiss often sealed the contract though the kiss was less significant than the ritual of homage and the swearing of fealty.

The word fealty derives from the Latin fidelitas and denotes the fidelity owed by a vassal to his feudal lord. Fealty also refers to an oath that more explicitly reinforces the commitments of the vassal made during homage. Once the commendation was complete, the lord and vassal were now in a feudal relationship with agreed-upon mutual obligations to one another. The vassal's principal obligation to the lord was the performance of military service. Using whatever equipment the vassal could obtain by virtue of the revenues from the fief, the vassal was responsible to answer calls to military service on behalf of the lord.

The equipment required and the duration of the service was usually agreed upon between the parties in detail in advance. For example, a vassal such as a baron, with a wealthy fiefdom lived well off the revenues of his lands and was able (and required) to provide a correspondingly impressive number of knights when called upon. Considering that each knight needed to attend his service with horses, armor, weapons, and even food and provisions to keep himself, his animals, and his attendants for the demanded period of time, a baron’s service to the king could be costly in the extreme.

This security of military help was the primary reason the lord entered into the feudal relationship, but the vassal had another obligation to his lord, namely attendance at his court, whether manorial, baronial or at the king's court itself in the form of parliament. This involved the vassal providing "counsel", so that if the lord faced a major decision he would summon all his vassals and hold a council. On the manorial level this might be a fairly mundane matter of agricultural policy, but the duty also included service as a juror when the lord handed down sentences for criminal offenses, up to and including in cases of capital punishment. Concerning the king's feudal court, the prototype of parliament, such deliberation could include the question of declaring war. Depending on the period of time and the location of the court, baronial, or manorial estate, feudal customs and practices varied. See examples of feudalism.

Varieties of feudal tenure

Under the feudal system several different forms of land tenure existed, each effectively a contract with differing rights and duties attached thereto. The main varieties are as follows:

Military tenure
Freehold (indeterminate & hereditable):
by barony (per baroniam). Such tenure constituted the holder a feudal baron, and was the highest degree of tenure. It imposed duties of military service. In time barons were differentiated between greater and lesser barons, with only greater barons being guaranteed attendance at parliament. All such holders were necessarily tenants-in-chief.
by knight-service. This was a tenure ranking below barony, and was likewise for military service, of a lesser extent. It could be held in capite from the king or as a mesne tenancy from a tenant-in-chief.
by castle-guard. This was a form of military service which involved guarding a nearby castle for a specified number of days per year.
by scutage where the military service obligations had been commuted, or replaced, by money payments. Common during the decline of the feudal era and symbolic of the change from tenure by personal service to tenure for money rent. As such tenure had at one time been military, the jurist Henry de Bracton (d.1268) deemed it to be still categorised as a military tenure.

Non-military tenure
Freehold (indeterminate & hereditable):
by serjeanty. Such tenure was in return for acting as a servant to the king, in a non-military capacity. Service in a ceremonial form is termed “grand serjeanty” whilst that of a more functional or menial nature is termed “petty sergeanty”.
by frankalmoinage, generally a tenure restricted to clerics.
Non-freehold (fixed-term & non-hereditable):
by copyhold, where the duties and rights were tailored to the requirements of the lord of the manor and a copy of the terms agreed was entered on the roll of the manorial court as a record of such non-standard terms.
by socage. This was the lowest form of tenure, involving payment in produce or in money.

See also

References and sources
References

Sources
 Encyclopædia Britannica, 9th. ed. vol. 9, pp. 119–123, "Feudalism"

Further reading
Barlow, F. (1988) The Feudal Kingdom of England 1042-1216. 4th edition, London.
Round, J. Horace. (1909) Feudal England. London.
Molyneux-Child, J.W. (1987) The Evolution of the English Manorial System. Lewes: The Book Guild.

External links
"Feudalism", by Thomas. D. Crage. Encyclopædia Britannica Online.
"Feudalism?", by Paul Halsall. Internet Medieval Sourcebook.

 
Economy of medieval England